The Rarău Massif is a subgroup of the Moldo-Transylvanian Carpathians, located in the Eastern Romanian Carpathians.

Location and geography 
The Rarău Massif is located in northern Romania (Suceava County), in the historical region of Bukovina, between the valleys of the Moldova and Bistrița rivers. The closest population centers are the towns of Câmpulung Moldovenesc and Vatra Dornei and the commune of Pojorâta. The total surface of the Rarău Massif is ca. 160 square kilometers.

The peak is easily accessible on foot on marked trails. By car, the Massif is accessible up to an altitude of 1520m, via the Transrarău road (DJ175B).

The Massif is known for its many picturesque limestone formations. The best known is Pietrele Doamnei, a group of three large limestone pillars located at a height of 1400m, close to the peak.

Climate 

References

Carpathian Foothills
Carpathians
Bukovina